Luehdorfia is a genus of butterflies in the family Papilionidae. 
It contains the following species:
 Luehdorfia chinensis – Chinese luehdorfia
 Luehdorfia japonica – Japanese luehdorfia
 Luehdorfia puziloi
 Luehdorfia taibai

Etymology
The genus name is for Friedrich August Lühdorf, a Bremen trader who made a commercial expedition to Japan in 1854.

External links
 Tree of Life project
 Pteron Images of L. chinensis, L. puziloi and L. japonica

 
Papilionidae
Taxa named by Carl Friedrich August Alexander Crüger
Butterfly genera
Taxonomy articles created by Polbot